Sugar Ray Xulu Stadium is a multi-purpose stadium in Clermont, a township of Durban, South Africa. It is currently used mostly for football matches and was selected as one of the 3 training venues of the 2010 FIFA World Cup after being renovated in 2010 and brought up to FIFA standards.

The stadium's small capacity was expanded from 1,700 to 6,500 as a lasting legacy of the World Cup.

The stadium is named after Cedric 'Sugar Ray' Xulu, a footballer considered a living legend in Durban whose career in the 1960s led him to play for local side AmaZulu and Mbabane Swallows in Swaziland.

References

Soccer venues in South Africa
Multi-purpose stadiums in South Africa
Sports venues in Durban